Ilmari Voudelin (21 June 1896 – 14 April 1946) was a Finnish cyclist. He competed in two events at the 1924 Summer Olympics.

References

External links
 

1896 births
1946 deaths
Finnish male cyclists
Olympic cyclists of Finland
Cyclists at the 1924 Summer Olympics
People from Pukkila
Sportspeople from Uusimaa